The eighth season of Australian Idol premiered on 30 January 2023. It is the show's first season since 2009. It airs on Seven Network, after the network had bought the rights to the series from Network 10.

Production

On 21 October 2020, Seven Network announced at their annual upfronts that they will be reviving the series, originally slated for 2022. It was later delayed until 2023.

Ricki-Lee Coulter and Scott Tweedie are the hosts, with the judging panel consisting of former American Idol judge Harry Connick Jr., former Australian Idol judge Kyle Sandilands, Amy Shark and Meghan Trainor. Original judge Marcia Hines will appear as a guest judge.

The series is produced by Eureka Productions.

Auditions

Auditions were held in various cities around Australia. If an auditionee received a "yes" vote from at least three of the four judges, they received a "golden ticket", which put them into the top 50. In a few cases, a single judge visited a remote location, and auditionees were accepted or rejected for the top 50 by that judge alone.

  Singer did not receive a golden ticket

Auditions 1 (30 January)

Auditions 2 (31 January)

Angus and Bobby Holmes are brothers who both performed separately, however when it was found out they were brothers they auditioned together and both received golden tickets.

Auditions 3 (1 February)

Auditions 4 (5 February)

Haze Harrington auditioned twice, in two different cities.

Auditions 5 (6 February)

Jakob Poyner was originally rejected at first, until Meghan changed her mind.
Elizabeth Pardallis and Ethan Hill auditions were compiled.

Auditions 6 (7 February)

Yasmin and Yolanda Absolom audition was shown again.

Auditions 7 (12 February)

Top 50

Marcia Hines, who was a judge for all of the seven seasons of Australian Idol's original run, replaced Meghan Trainor during the Top 50 rounds.

Top 50 Part 1 (13 February)

  Singers did not make it

Top 50 Part 2 (14 February)
32 contestants reached this round. Each contestant sang a song solo in front of a live audience. The judges then decided who would progress to the final 24.

Top 24

The Top 24 was divided into three rounds, with eight singers performing in each round, and four singers from each round progressing to the Top 12. A judge could put a singer through to the Top 12 by awarding a "touchdown", with each judge allowed to award one "touchdown" across the three rounds. The other singers that progressed to the Top 12 were announced by the judges at the end of each round.

  Singer received a "Touchdown" and advanced to the Top 12
  Singer did not make the Top 12

Top 24 Part 1 (19 February)

Top 24 Part 2 (20 February)

Top 24 Part 3 (21 February)

Weekly Song Themes

Group/Guest Performances

Top 12 Finalists

Josh Hannan

Audition: "Brother" (Matt Corby)
Top 50 Part 1-Round 1: "Landslide" (Fleetwood Mac)
Top 50 Part 1-Round 2: "Perfect" (Ed Sheeran)
Top 50 Part 2: "It'll Be Okay" (Shawn Mendes)
Top 24: "Glimpse of Us" (Joji)
Top 12: "You Found Me" (The Fray)
Top 10: "Forget Me"  (Lewis Capaldi) <-- song picked by Judge: Meghan Trainor
Top 8: "Fix You" (Coldplay) ~ Judges’ Choice
Top 6: "Drivers License" (Olivia Rodrigo)
Top 6: Head-to-head: "Can't Help Falling in Love"  (Elvis Presley)

Royston Sagigi-Baira

Audition: "I’m Not the Only One" (Sam Smith)
Top 50 Part 1-Round 1: "Wrecking Ball" (Miley Cyrus)
Top 50 Part 1-Round 2: "I'll Be There" (Jess Glynne)
Top 50 Part 2: "Everything I Wanted" (Billie Eilish)
Top 24: "Versace on the Floor" (Bruno Mars)
Top 12: "Man In The Mirror" (Michael Jackson)
Top 10:  "I Won't Let You Go" (James Morrison) <-- song picked by Judge: Amy Shark
Top 8: "The Climb" (Miley Cyrus)
Top 6: "True Colors" (Cyndi Lauper)
Top 6: Head-to-head: "I Want to Know What Love Is" (Foreigner)

Phoebe Stewart

Audition: "One and Only" (Adele)
Top 50 Part 1-Round 1: - Landslide   (Fleetwood Mac)
Top 50 Part 1-Round 2: "I'll Be There" (Jess Glynne)
Top 50 Part 2: "Lose You to Love Me" (Selena Gomez)
Top 24: "You Got the Love" (Florence and the Machine) ~ TOUCHDOWN!
Top 12: "Beneath Your Beautiful" (Labrinth ft. Emeli Sandé) ~ Judges’ Choice
Top 10: "Dancing Queen" (ABBA)  <-- song picked by Judge: Meghan Trainor
Top 8: "You Say" (Lauren Daigle)
Top 8-Bottom 4: "Call Out My Name" (the Weeknd)
Top 6: "People Help the People" (Birdy)
Top 6: Head-to-head: "Lost Without You" (Freya Ridings)

Anya Hynninen

Audition: "Ring Of Fire" (Johnny Cash)
Top 50 Part 1-Round 1: - Landslide (Fleetwood Mac)
Top 50 Part 1-Round 2: "Can't Stop the Feeling!" (Justin Timberlake)
Top 50 Part 2: "I Was Made for Lovin' You" (Kiss)
Top 24: "The Best" (Tina Turner) ~ TOUCHDOWN!
Top 12: "Papa Don't Preach" (Madonna)
Top 10: "Back to Black" (Amy Winehouse) <-- song picked by Judge: Amy Shark
Top 10-Bottom 4: "Killing Me Softly" (Roberta Flack)
Top 8: "Feeling Good" (Nina Simone)
Top 6: "Flowers" (Miley Cyrus)
Top 6: Head-to-head: "It's a Man's Man's Man's World" (James Brown) – Eliminated on 20 March

Ben Sheehy

Audition: "Whole Lotta Love" (Led Zeppelin)
Top 50 Part 1-Round 1: "Wrecking Ball" (Miley Cyrus)
Top 50 Part 1-Round 2: "Roar" (Katy Perry)
Top 50 Part 2: "Fortunate Son" (Creedence Clearwater Revival)
Top 24: "Immigrant Song" (Led Zeppelin)
Top 12: "Blaze of Glory" (Jon Bon Jovi)
Top 12-Bottom 4: "River Deep – Mountain High" (Ike and Tina Turner)
Top 10: "Beggin'"  (Måneskin) <-- song picked by Judge: Meghan Trainor
Top 10-Bottom 4: "Gimme Shelter" (The Rolling Stones)
Top 8: "Joker & the Thief" (Wolfmother)
Top 6: "(I Can't Get No) Satisfaction" (The Rolling Stones)
Top 6: Head-to-head: "The Letter" (Joe Crocker) - Eliminated on 20 March

Amali Dimond

Audition: "Make You Feel My Love" (Adele)
Top 50 Part 1-Round 1: "Wrecking Ball" (Miley Cyrus)
Top 50 Part 1-Round 2: "Time After Time" (Cyndi Lauper)
Top 50 Part 2: "Before You Go" (Lewis Capaldi)
Top 24: "Unstoppable" (Sia)
Top 12: "Grenade" (Bruno Mars)
Top 10: "Titanium" (David Guetta) <-- song picked by Judge: Harry Connick Jr.
Top 8: "Unconditionally" (Katy Perry)
Top 8-Bottom 4: "Secret Love Song" (Little Mix)
Top 6: "Fly Away" (Tones and I)
Top 6: Head-to-head:  "Warrior" (Demi Lovato) – Eliminated on 20 March

Angelina Curtis

Audition: "Message to My Girl" (Split Enz)
Top 50 Part 1-Round 1: "Try" (Pink)
Top 50 Part 1-Round 2: "Time After Time" (Cyndi Lauper)
Top 50 Part 2: "Strong" (London Grammar)
Top 24: "The Only Exception" (Paramore) ~ TOUCHDOWN!
Top 12: "I Don't Want to Miss a Thing" (Aerosmith)
Top 10: "As It Was"  (Harry Styles) <-- song picked by Judge: Meghan Trainor
Top 8: "Born To Try" (Delta Goodrem)
Top 8-Bottom 4:  "Talking to the Moon" (Bruno Mars) – Eliminated on 13 March

Noora H

Audition: "She Wolf" (Sia)
Top 50 Part 1-Round 1: "Dangerous Woman" (Ariana Grande)
Top 50 Part 1-Round 2: "Just the Way You Are" (Bruno Mars)
Top 50 Part 2: "Stay" (Rihanna)
Top 24: "Hopelessly Devoted to You" (Olivia Newton-John)
Top 12: "Shallow" (Lady Gaga and Bradley Cooper)
Top 12-Bottom 4: "I Have Nothing" (Whitney Houston)
Top 10: "The Voice Within" (Christina Aguilera) <-- song picked by Judge: Harry Connick Jr. ~ Judges’ Choice
Top 8: "Scared To Be Lonely" (Dua Lipa and Martin Garrix)
Top 8-Bottom 4: "Chandelier" (Sia) – Eliminated on 13 March

Sash Seabourne

Audition: "I Wanna Dance with Somebody" (Whitney Houston)
Top 50 Part 1-Round 1: "Landslide" (Fleetwood Mac)
Top 50 Part 1-Round 2: "Time After Time" (Cyndi Lauper)
Top 50 Part 2: "Finally" (CeCe Peniston)
Top 24: "Sex on Fire" (Kings of Leon)
Top 12: "Every Breath You Take" (The Police)
Top 10: "In The Air Tonight" (Phil Collins) <-- song picked by Judge: Kyle Sandilands
Top 10-Bottom 4: "Free Fallin'" (Tom Petty) – Eliminated on 6 March

Harry Hayden

Audition: "I Am Changing" (Jennifer Hudson)
Top 50 Part 1-Round 1: "Someone You Loved" (Lewis Capaldi)
Top 50 Part 1-Round 2: "Just the Way You Are" (Bruno Mars)
Top 50 Part 2: "You Know I'm No Good" (Amy Winehouse)
Top 24: "Take Me to Church" (Hozier)
Top 12: "How Will I Know" (Whitney Houston)
Top 10: "Black and Gold" (Sam Sparro) <-- song picked by Judge: Harry Connick Jr.
Top 10-Bottom 4: "Bust Your Windows" (Jazmine Sullivan) – Eliminated on 6 March

Maya Weiss

Audition: "Wings" (Little Mix)
Top 50 Part 1-Round 1: "Dangerous Woman" (Ariana Grande)
Top 50 Part 1-Round 2: "I'll Be There" (Jess Glynne)
Top 50 Part 2: "Ain't Nobody" (Chaka Khan)
Top 24: "Addicted to You" (Avicii) ~ TOUCHDOWN!
Top 12: "Cold Heart" (Elton John and Dua Lipa)
Top 12-Bottom 4: "Titanium" (Sia) – Eliminated on 27 February

Jasey Fox

Audition: "Bohemian Rhapsody" (Queen)
Top 50 Part 1-Round 1: "Wrecking Ball" (Miley Cyrus)
Top 50 Part 1-Round 2: "Time After Time" (Cyndi Lauper)
Top 50 Part 2: "Does Your Mother Know" (ABBA)
Top 24: "Grace Kelly" (Mika)
Top 12: "Youngblood" (5 Seconds of Summer)
Top 12-Bottom 4: "Waking Up in Vegas" (Katy Perry) – Eliminated on 27 February

Live Performances

During each round of the live performances, each contestant sings a song with a given theme. After all contestants have sung, the judges choose one contestant to directly advance to the next stage, then the public is given approximately 24 hours to vote for their favourite singers. During the results night, after voting has closed, the four contestants with the fewest votes sing again, then the two contestants with the lowest votes are eliminated.

  Singer received immunity and advanced to the next stage
  Singer was in the bottom four
  Singer was eliminated

Top 12 (26 - 27 February)

Top 10 (5 - 6 March)

Top 8 (12 - 13 March)

 Kyle was absent on performance night.

Top 6 (19 - 20 March)

Each contestant performed a song on live performance night, however, in a twist, the judges’ announced no singer would be saved or advanced this week and therefore would be voted by the public. On results night, after voting had closed, the contestants each sang again. After each pair of contestants had sung, the results were announced for those two singers: one eliminated, and one was put through to the Grand Finale, three in total.

Grand Finale Performances

Voting closes before the Grand Finale performances.

Grand Finale (26 March)

Elimination chart

Ratings 
The show premiered on 30 January 2023 to modest ratings, less than half the viewers of Married at First Sight on Nine and slightly behind Australian Survivor on Ten, which both premiered on the same night.

References

Australian Idol
2023 Australian television seasons